Golden Lily is an unincorporated community in Alexander County, Illinois, United States. Golden Lily is located along Illinois Route 37 west of Mound City.

References

Unincorporated communities in Alexander County, Illinois
Unincorporated communities in Illinois
Cape Girardeau–Jackson metropolitan area